Lavelli is a surname. Notable people with the surname include: 

Cecilia Lavelli (1906–1998), Italian artist
Dante Lavelli (1923–2009), American football player
Jorge Lavelli (born 1932), French theater and opera director 
Rino Lavelli (born 1928), Italian long-distance runner
Tony Lavelli (1926–1998), American basketball player and musician